Haukur Páll Sigurðsson (born 5 August 1987) is an Icelandic international footballer who plays for Valur, as a left back.

Club career
Haukur has played club football in Iceland and Norway for Þróttur, Alta and Valur. He signed with Valur in 2010. In 2020, he won the Icelandic championship for the third time.

International career
He made his international debut for Iceland in 2012.

References

1987 births
Living people
Haukur Pall Sigurdsson
Haukur Pall Sigurdsson
Haukur Pall Sigurdsson
Haukur Pall Sigurdsson
Association football fullbacks
Haukur Pall Sigurdsson
Alta IF players
Haukur Pall Sigurdsson
Haukur Pall Sigurdsson
Expatriate footballers in Norway
Norwegian First Division players